Rosalyn P. Scott (born 1950) is an American thoracic surgeon known for her work in education and for being the first African-American woman to become a thoracic surgeon.

Early life and education 

Scott was born and raised in Newark, New Jersey and was inspired to become a physician by both her father and uncle. Her father was a dentist, and his dental office was the source of Scott's early exposure to medicine where she helped on Saturday mornings by cleaning dental instruments, editing information on charts, and organizing patient documents. Scott's father suffered from a heart attack when she was in the third grade. However, he lived through it and later encouraged Scott to become a cardiothoracic surgeon. Not only was Scott inspired by her father, but her uncle was a thoracic surgeon and President of the hospital where he worked in Chicago.

In Troy, New York, Scott attended Rensselaer Polytechnic Institute for her undergraduate education, and earned a bachelor's degree in chemistry in 1970. She then moved on to the New York University School of Medicine, and graduated in 1974, despite being a victim of sexism and racism in the medical field during that time. She remained in New York City for internships and residency at both St. Vincent's Hospital and Medical Center and St. Clare's Hospital and Health Center. Scott continued her residency as a thoracic surgeon at Boston University Medical Center from 1977 to 1979. She then returned to New York City from Boston for residencies at St. Clare's Hospital and Health Center, once again, and New York Medical College, where she specialized in cardiac surgery and general surgery. By doing this, Scott became the first African American woman to establish a residency in cardiothoracic surgery.  Scott continued her training in cardiovascular surgery as a fellow at the Texas Heart Institute, where she was the first ever to receive the Mary A. Fraley cardiovascular fellowship in 1980. In 1994, Dr. Scott received a Masters of Science in Health Administration from the University of Colorado College of Business.

Career 

In 1981, after Scott completed her postgraduate education, she was appointed as an assistant professor of surgery at the University of Texas Medical School in Houston. She stayed in Houston until 1983 when she was then appointed as the assistant professor of surgery at UCLA and the Charles R. Drew School of Medicine and Science. In 1987, she left UCLA but continued her teaching role at Drew University of medicine. While at Drew University, Dr. Scott served as the associate director of the general surgery residency program (1990-1997), vice chair for research and academic affairs in the surgery department (1991-1997), as well as the director of the Drew Surgical Research Group (1993-1997). She was also an associate research professor (1994-1997) and adjunct professor (1998-2001) at the School of Health Administration and Policy at Arizona State University. Scott served as the Interim Director of the residency program for general surgery at Drew (2003-2004). While she had her appointment at the Drew Medical Center, Dr. Scott was also on the surgical staff of the Brotman Medical Center and the Harbour-UCLA Medical Center. While working at these locations, she focused on research for occupational stress within surgical residents and the health disparities in cardiovascular and lung cancer care.  In 2007, she left Drew for Wright State University, where she is currently a professor as well as the Chief of Surgical Services at the Dayton Veterans Affairs Medical Center in Dayton, Ohio.
Scott has been a pioneer for African-American women in the field of thoracic surgery and surgical education. She was the first African-American woman to become a thoracic surgeon and she was also the first African-American woman to be admitted to the Society of University Surgeons. She co-founded two organizations to support other surgeons and encourage students to fight discrimination: the Society of Black Academic Surgeons which was founded in 1986, and the Association of Black Cardiovascular and Thoracic Surgeons which was founded in 1999.[1]

Research 
Scott has conducted extensive research over the years pertaining to the thoracic region of the body.  Her research includes health care disparities affecting people with cardiovascular disease and lung cancer, and occupational stress affecting surgeons. She has served on numerous research boards as well as created other organizations for cardiovascular and thoracic doctors, including the Association of Black Cardiovascular and Thoracic Surgeons.

In 2015 Scott played an integral role in opening a state of the art simulation facility at the Dayton VA. The simulation center is the only mobile simulation center in the VA system. It includes equipment such as mannequins that have all of the vital functions of a real person in order to simulate real situations that occur in the hospital. The facility also includes all of the necessary equipment for emergency situations and technology to record the simulations, so they can be played back.

Honors, awards, and distinctions 
 The first African American woman to be trained in thoracic surgery (1977)
 The first Mary A. Fraley Fellow, Texas Heart Institute (1980)
 Founding member, Society of Black Academic Surgeons (1986)
 First African American woman to become a member of the Society of University Surgeons (1995)
 Founding member, Association of Black Cardiovascular and Thoracic Surgeons (1999)
 Former President, Women in Thoracic Surgery

References 

1950 births
Living people
African-American physicians
American thoracic surgeons
American women physicians
Physicians from Newark, New Jersey
Women surgeons
African-American women physicians
21st-century African-American people
21st-century African-American women
20th-century African-American people
20th-century African-American women